Oleg Strekalov (born 22 August 1967 in Khmelnick, Ukraine) is a Russian journalist and former proprietor of Chekhov Vid, an independent media organization in the Russian municipality of Chekhov in the Moscow Region.

Media career
Strekalov worked as a journalist in Ukraine, his articles published in popular Ukrainian media including The Focus and The Correspondent. Between 2011 and 2014 he was a member of the Union of Russian Journalists.

Strekalov created the media holding company Chekov Vid, which included a news channel, the newspaper Read All and an internet portal.

Career in construction
In 2005, he led the construction of the ice palace in Chekhov, for which he was awarded the title of "Honored Builder of the Moscow Region" by the Governor of the Moscow Region Boris Gromov. In the village of Yakshino, Chekhov district, he rebuilt the church of the Georgian Mother of God and built a parish school there.

Media Justice Foundation
In 2017 Strekalov founded the Strekalov Media Justice Foundation to promote independent journalism and to help those like himself defend themselves against state intervention

Awards
In 2014, for financial assistance to the parishes of the Chekhov Deanery, he was awarded Patriarch Kirill.

References

Living people
1967 births
21st-century Russian journalists